Pine View Farm is a historic home located at Hillsdale in Columbia County, New York. It was built in 1845 and is a -story rectangular frame dwelling with a moderately pitched gable roof. The interior features elements of Greek Revival–style details. Also on the property is a former carriage house.

It was added to the National Register of Historic Places in 2002.

References

Houses on the National Register of Historic Places in New York (state)
Houses completed in 1845
Houses in Columbia County, New York
National Register of Historic Places in Columbia County, New York